Hippo grass is a common name for several plants and may refer to:

Echinochloa stagnina
Vossia cuspidata